Hiawatha (Haiëñ'wa'tha) is a Native American semi-historical figure who was the co-founder of the Iroquois Confederacy.

Hiawatha may also refer to:

Arts
A fictional character in the epic poem by Henry Wadsworth Longfellow, The Song of Hiawatha
 The Song of Hiawatha (Coleridge-Taylor), a trilogy of cantatas by Samuel Coleridge-Taylor, based on Longfellow's poem; the first part Hiawatha's Wedding Feast is the best known
Little Hiawatha (a.k.a. Hiawatha), a 1937 animated family comedy short film produced by Walt Disney as part of 1937's Silly Symphonies
Hiawatha (1952 film), a 1952 film starring Vince Edwards
Hiawatha (1913 film), a 1913 American silent drama film 
"Hiawatha (A Summer Idyl)", a popular instrumental song written by Neil Moret in 1901
Hiawatha (sculpture), a 19th-century marble by Augustus Saint-Gaudens

Other
Hiawatha (web server), a web server developed by Hugo Leisink since 2002
Hiawatha Music Festival, an annual traditional, acoustic, American music festival held in Marquette, Michigan, United States
Hiawatha Seaway Council, a local council of the Boy Scouts of America headquartered in Syracuse, New York, United States

People
Hiawatha Bray, columnist for The Boston Globe
Hiawatha Coleridge-Taylor, son of Samuel Coleridge-Taylor
Hiawatha Estes (1918–2003), California-based architect

Places

Australia 
Hiawatha, Victoria, a town in the Shire of Wellington

Canada 
Hiawatha First Nation, Ontario
Island of Hiawatha, former name of the Toronto Islands, Ontario

Greenland 
Hiawatha Glacier

United States 
Hiawatha, Colorado, a place in Moffat County
Hiawatha, Iowa
Hiawatha, Kansas
Hiawatha, Minneapolis, Minnesota
Hiawatha, Nebraska
Lake Hiawatha, New Jersey
Hiawatha, Utah
Hiawatha, West Virginia
Hiawatha Island in Tioga County, New York
Hiawatha Lake in Syracuse, New York
Lake Hiawatha in Minneapolis, Minnesota
Hiawatha Township, Michigan
Hiawatha National Forest in Michigan

Ships
USS Hiawatha, the name of several United States Navy ships
MV Hiawatha, an 1895 passenger ferry in Toronto, Canada
Steamboat Hiawatha, an Ocklawaha River passenger steamer on the St. Johns River in Palatka, Florida, United States
Hiawatha (riverboat), an American paddlewheel river boat

Transportation routes
Hiawatha (train), a fleet of named passenger trains of the Chicago, Milwaukee, St. Paul and Pacific Railroad in the United States
Hiawatha Service, a descendant of the above
Hiawatha Line, the former name of the METRO Blue Line, a light rail corridor in Minneapolis and neighboring Bloomington, Minnesota, United States
Hiawatha Avenue, a highway in Minneapolis, Minnesota, United States
Hiawatha LRT Trail, a mixed-use path in Minneapolis, Minnesota, United States
Min Hi Line, a linear park parallel to Minnehaha and Hiawatha Avenues in Minneapolis, Minnesota, United States